Cédric Ciza (born 2 February 1990 in Bujumbura) is a Burundian footballer who plays for R.S.C. Anderlecht.

Career 
Ciza began his career with F.C. Ganshoren and was in summer 2004 scouted from R.S.C. Anderlecht. He left than in summer 2009 the Belgium club R.S.C. Anderlecht and signed in the Netherlands a loan deal with MVV Maastricht. In December 2009 returned to RSC Anderlecht and joined after his return to the league rival Charleroi SC.

International career 
Ciza was in the Squad from Belgium U-17 for the U-17 EM in Belgium 2007.

References

External links

1990 births
Living people
Sportspeople from Bujumbura
Burundian footballers
Burundian expatriate sportspeople in Belgium
Burundian expatriate footballers
R.S.C. Anderlecht players
Association football midfielders